The Plymouth Company, officially known as the Virginia Company of Plymouth, was a company chartered by King James in 1606 along with the Virginia Company of London with responsibility for colonizing the east coast of America between latitudes 38° and 45° N.

History 
The merchants (with George Popham named in the patent) agreed to finance the settlers’ trip in return for repayment of their expenses plus interest out of the profits made. The Plymouth Company established the one-year Popham Colony in present-day Maine in 1607, the northern answer to Jamestown Colony.  The Popham Colony was abandoned in 1608.  In 1620, after years of disuse, the Plymouth Company was revived and reorganized as the Plymouth Council for New England. With a new charter, the New England Charter of 1620. The Plymouth Company had 40 patentees at that point, and established the Council for New England to oversee their efforts, but it stopped operating in 1624;.

The Council for New England was not dissolved until 1635 and issued several patents after 1624, including one to John Mason for New Hampshire and to New Plymouth Colony with the Bradford patent of 1630.

References

1606 establishments in England
1624 disestablishments in England
English colonization of the Americas
History of New England
Virginia Company